23 (twenty-three) is the natural number following 22 and preceding 24.

In mathematics 
Twenty-three is the ninth prime number, the smallest odd prime that is not a twin prime. It is, however, a cousin prime with 19, and a sexy prime with 17 as well as 29. Twenty-three is also the fifth factorial prime, and the second Woodall prime. It is an Eisenstein prime with no imaginary part and real part of the form 3n − 1. 23 is the fifth Sophie Germain prime and the fourth safe prime, 23 is the next to last member of the first Cunningham chain of the first kind to have five terms (2, 5, 11, 23, 47). Since 14! + 1 is a multiple of 23 but 23 is not one more than a multiple of 14, 23 is the first Pillai prime. 23 is the smallest odd prime to be a highly cototient number, as the solution to x − φ(x) for the integers 95, 119, 143, 529. It is also a happy number in base-10.

 In decimal, 23 is the second Smarandache–Wellin prime, as it is the concatenation of the decimal representations of the first two primes (2 and 3) and is itself also prime.

 23 is the first prime p for which unique factorization of cyclotomic integers based on the p the root of unity breaks down.

 The sum of the first 23 primes is 874, which is divisible by 23, a property shared by few other numbers.

 In the list of fortunate numbers, 23 occurs twice, since adding 23 to either the fifth or eighth primorial gives a prime number (namely 2333 and 9699713).

 23 has the distinction of being one of two integers that cannot be expressed as the sum of fewer than 9 cubes of positive integers (the other is 239). See Waring's problem.

 23 is the number of trees on 8 unlabeled nodes. It is also a Wedderburn–Etherington number, which are numbers that can be used to count certain binary trees.

 The natural logarithms of all positive integers lower than 23 are known to have binary BBP-type formulae.

 23 is the smallest positive solution to Sunzi's original formulation of the Chinese remainder theorem.

 According to the birthday paradox, in a group of 23 or more randomly chosen people, the probability is more than 50% that some pair of them will have the same birthday.  A related coincidence is that 365 times the natural logarithm of 2, approximately 252.999, is very close to the number of pairs of 23 items and 22nd triangular number, 253.

 23 is the smallest prime number p such that the largest consecutive pair of p-smooth numbers is the same as the largest consecutive pair of (p − 1)-smooth numbers. That is, the largest consecutive pair of 23-smooth numbers (11859210, 11859211) is the same as the largest consecutive pair of 22-smooth numbers, where 23 is the smallest prime for which this is true.

 The first 23 odd prime numbers (up to 89) are all cluster primes p such that every even positive integer k ⩽ p − 3 can be written as the sum of two prime numbers that do not exceed p.

 The first Mersenne number of the form  that does not yield a prime number when inputting a prime exponent is 2047 (with ), which factorizes as 23 x 89.

 23! is twenty-three digits long in decimal. There are only three other numbers that have this property: 1, 22, and 24.

R23 is the third decimal repunit prime after R2 and R19, followed by R1031.

In geometry 

The Leech lattice Λ24 is a 24-dimensional lattice through which 23 other positive definite even unimodular Niemeier lattices of rank 24 are built, and vice-versa. Λ24 represents the solution to the kissing number in 24 dimensions as the precise lattice structure for the maximum number of spheres that can fill 24-dimensional space without overlapping, equal to 196,560 spheres. These 23 Niemeier lattices are located at deep holes of radii  in lattice points around its automorphism group, Conway group . The Leech lattice can be constructed in various ways, which include:

 Through the extended binary Golay code  and Witt design , which produce a construction of the 196,560 minimal vectors in the Leech lattice. The extended binary Golay code is an extension of the perfect binary Golay code , which has codewords of size 23.  has Mathieu group  as its automorphism group, which is the second largest member of the first generation in the happy family of sporadic groups.  has a minimum faithful complex representation in 22 dimensions and group-3 actions on 253 objects, with 253 equal to the number of pairs of objects in a set of 23 objects. In turn,  is the automorphism group of Mathieu group , which works through  to generate 8-element octads whose individual elements occur 253 times through its entire block design.

 Using Niemer lattices D24 of group order 223·24! and Coxeter number 46 = 2·23, it can be made into a module over the ring of integers of quadratic field , whereby multiplying D24 by a non-principal ideal of the ring of integers yields the Leech lattice. 

Conway and Sloane provided constructions of the Leech lattice from all other 23 Niemeier lattices.

Twenty-three four-dimensional crystal families exist within the classification of space groups. These are accompanied by six enantiomorphic forms, which maximizes the total count to twenty-nine crystal families. In three dimensions, five cubes can be arranged to form twenty-three free pentacubes, or twenty-nine distinct one-sided pentacubes (counting reflections).

There are 23 three-dimensional uniform polyhedra that are cell facets inside uniform 4-polytopes that are not part of infinite families of antiprismatic prisms and duoprisms: the five Platonic solids, the thirteen Archimedean solids, and five semiregular prisms (the triangular prism, pentagonal prism, hexagonal prism, octagonal prism, and decagonal prism).

23 Coxeter groups of paracompact hyperbolic honeycombs in the third dimension generate 151 unique Wythoffian constructions of paracompact honeycombs. 23 four-dimensional Euclidean honeycombs are generated from the  cubic group, and 23 five-dimensional uniform polytopes are generated from the  demihypercubic group.

In two-dimensional geometry, the regular 23-sided icositrigon is the first regular polygon that is not constructible with a compass and straight edge or with the aide of an angle trisector (since it is neither a Fermat prime nor a Pierpont prime), nor by neusis or a double-notched straight edge. It is also not constructible with origami, however it is through other traditional methods for all regular polygons.

In science and technology 
 The atomic number of vanadium.
 The atomic mass number of the stable isotope of sodium.
 Normal human sex cells have 23 chromosomes. Other human cells have 46 chromosomes, arranged in 23 pairs.
 23 is the width of the Arecibo message, sent to space in search for extraterrestrial intelligence.
 23 is the TCP/IP port used for telnet and is the default for the telnet command.
 The earth's axis is tilted at approximately 23°.

In religion 
 In Biblical numerology, it is associated with Psalm 23, also known as the Shepherd Psalm. It is possibly the most quoted and best known Psalm. Psalms is also the 23rd book in the Douay–Rheims Bible.
 In Islam, the Qur'an was revealed in a total of 23 years to Muhammed.
 Muslims believe the first verses of the Qur'an were revealed to the Islamic prophet Muhammad on the 23rd night of the 9th Islamic month.
 Principia Discordia, the sacred text of Discordianism, holds that 23 (along with the discordian prime 5) is one of the sacred numbers of Eris, goddess of discord.

In popular culture

Music 

 Alfred Harth uses the number 23 in his artist name Alfred 23 Harth, or A23H, since the year 1+9+8+5 = 23.
 Twentythree is the name of Tristan Prettyman's debut album
 Twentythree an album by Carbon Based Lifeforms
  "Viginti Tres" (Latin for twenty-three) is a song by Tool on their album 10,000 Days
 Blink-182's song "What's My Age Again?" includes the lyrics "nobody likes you when you're 23."
 23 is an album and title track by Blonde Redhead
 "23" is a song by Jimmy Eat World, on their album Futures. The number also appears in the songs "Christmas Card" and "12."23".95" as well as on some items of clothing produced by the band.
 Four tet and Yellowcard both have songs titled "Twenty-Three".
 Dear 23, an album by The Posies
 Untitled 23, an album by The Church
 Noah23 has several albums which reference the number 23.
 "23 Minutes in Brussels", a song by Luna on their album Penthouse.
 The composer Alban Berg had a particular interest in the number 23, using it to structure several works.  Various suggestions have been made as to the reason for this interest: that he took it from the Biorhythms theory of Wilhelm Fliess, in which a 23-day cycle is considered significant, or because he first suffered an asthma attack on 23rd of the month.
  "23" is a single by Mike Will Made It
 On the cover of The Beatles' 1969 album Yellow Submarine the number 23 is displayed on the chest of one of the Blue Meanies.
 Network 23 refers to members of the Spiral Tribe. Sometimes 23 used to discretely mark the spots of a freetekno rave.
 The number 23 is used a lot throughout the visuals and music by the band Gorillaz, who have even devoted a whole page of their autobiography Rise Of The Ogre to the 23 enigma theory.

Film and television 
 23 is a German film about Karl Koch.
 In Jeepers Creepers, the Creeper appears every 23 years for 23 days to feast on human body parts
 In L: Change the World, the protagonist L signs his own name in the Death Note notebook and somehow knows that he has given himself 23 days to live, revealing a 23-day rule for the maximum number of days a person may live after they are added to the Japanese god of death's Death Note.
 The 1980s TV series Max Headroom was set at Network 23.
 In The Big Lebowski, the main characters deliberately use only lane 23 at the bowling alley.
 In The Matrix Reloaded, the Architect tells Neo it is of utmost importance to choose 23 people to repopulate Zion.
 In the TV series Lost, 23 is one of the 6 reoccurring numbers (4, 8, 15, 16, 23, 42) that appear frequently throughout the show.
 The Number 23 is a 2007 film starring Jim Carrey about a man who becomes obsessed with the 23 enigma.

Other fields 

 23 skidoo (phrase) (sometimes 23 skiddoo) is an American slang phrase popularized during the early 20th century. 23 skidoo has been described as "perhaps the first truly national fad expression and one of the most popular fad expressions to appear in the U.S".
 The 23 enigma, proposed by William S. Burroughs plays a prominent role in the plot of the Illuminatus! Trilogy by Robert Shea and Robert Anton Wilson.
 The 23, in South Africa, refers to the 23 conscientious objectors who publicly refused to do military service in the Apartheid army in 1987. The following years the number increased to 143 (in 1988) and 771 (in 1989), with Apartheid being dismantled from 1990 onwards.
 X-23 is a character in the Marvel Universe. She is named for being the 23rd attempt to create a female genetic twin of Wolverine after attempts to create a male clone failed.
 23 is the number of times Julius Caesar was stabbed in the Theatre of Pompey.

In sports 
 Each national team competing in the FIFA World Cup or FIFA Women's World Cup is allowed a 23-player squad. This squad size has been in place since 2002 for men and 2015 for women.
 Nissan typically uses this number for their Motorsport manufacturer teams, as the numbers 2 and 3 are pronounced "ni" and "san" in Japanese.
 23 was basketball legend Michael Jordan's jersey number prior to his first retirement, then his chosen number again when he came out of retirement after a brief stint wearing the number 45.
23 was also the jersey number of Los Angeles Lakers small forward LeBron James, however he changed it to 6 in the 2021–22 NBA season.
 The maximum number of players on an NHL roster.

References

External links 

 23 facts, 23 images, 23 gallery, and links to other 23's

Integers